Loyola is a Basque surname. Notable people with the surname include:

Ángel Custodio Loyola (1926–1985), Venezuelan singer and composer
Carlos Díaz Loyola (1894–1968), Chilean poet, known as Pablo de Rokha
Ignacio Loyola Vera (born 1954), Mexican politician
Ignatius of Loyola (1491–1556), Catholic saint and founder of the Society of Jesus
José Inácio Candido de Loyola (1891-1973), Goan Catholic independence activist
Juan Loyola (1952–1999), Venezuelan artist
Margot Loyola (1918-2015), Chilean musician
Martín Ignacio de Loyola (1550–1616), Franciscan friar and circumnavigator

Basque-language surnames